Daniel Pereira Gil (born 14 July 2000) is a Venezuelan professional footballer who plays as a midfielder for Major League Soccer club Austin FC. He played two seasons of college soccer with the Virginia Tech Hokies before being selected with the first overall pick by Austin FC in the 2021 MLS SuperDraft.

Early life 
Pereira was born in Caracas, Venezuela, but at the age of 15 emigrated to the United States, where he settled in the Roanoke metropolitan area of Southwest Virginia. Prior to emigrating to the U.S., Pereira played for the Venezuelan U-14 and U-17 national teams.

In high school, Pereira played club soccer for Virginia Blue Ridge Star and high school soccer for Northside High School. While at Northside, Pereira was named the 2019 Virginia High School League Class 3 Boys' Soccer Player of the Year.

Ahead of the 2019 NCAA Division I men's soccer season, Pereira signed a National Letter of Intent to play college soccer for Virginia Tech. During his freshman season, Pereira started in all 19 matches, scoring five goals and providing five assists. During the season, the Hokies were ranked as high as ninth in the United Soccer Coaches poll. Virginia Tech reached the third round of the 2019 NCAA Division I Men's Soccer Tournament, before falling to Stanford.

His sophomore season was more truncated due to the ongoing COVID-19 pandemic. Nevertheless, during the fall segment of the season, Pereira started in all seven of the team's matches, providing a goal and an assist.

Club career 
Following the fall segment of the 2020 NCAA Division I men's soccer season, Pereira was tabbed as a potential top draft pick for the 2021 MLS SuperDraft. On 30 December 2020, Pereira waived his final two years of collegiate eligibility and signed a Generation Adidas contract with Major League Soccer. On 21 January 2021, he was selected as the first overall selection in the 2021 MLS SuperDraft, being drafted by expansion team, Austin FC. Pereira is the first Venezuelan and first South American to be selected first overall in the MLS Draft, as well as the first player from Virginia Tech to be selected first overall.

Career statistics

References

External links 
 
 Daniel Pereira at Virginia Tech Athletics

2000 births
Living people
Association football forwards
Venezuelan footballers
Soccer players from Virginia
Sportspeople from Roanoke, Virginia
Venezuelan expatriate footballers
Expatriate soccer players in the United States
Venezuelan expatriate sportspeople in the United States
Virginia Tech Hokies men's soccer players
Austin FC draft picks
Austin FC players
Major League Soccer first-overall draft picks
Footballers from Caracas
Venezuela youth international footballers
Major League Soccer players